(982–1054) was a Buddhist religious leader and master. He is generally associated with his work carried out at the Vikramashila monastery in Bihar. He was one of the major figures in the spread of 11th-century Mahayana and Vajrayana Buddhism in Asia and inspired Buddhist thought from Tibet to Sumatra. He is recognised as one of the greatest figures of medieval Buddhism. Atiśa's chief disciple, Dromtön, was the founder of the Kadam school, one of the New Translation schools of Tibetan Buddhism, later supplanted by the Gelug tradition in the 14th century which adopted its teachings and absorbed its monasteries. 

In 2004, Atiśa was ranked 18th in the BBC's poll of the greatest Bengalis of all time.

Early life

Palace life 
Bikrampur, the most probable place for Atiśa's birthplace, was the capital of the Pala Empire as it was of the ancient kingdoms of southeast Bengal. Though the city's exact location is not certain, it presently lies in the Munshiganj District of Bangladesh, and continues to be celebrated as an early center of Buddhist cultural, academic, and political life. Similar to Gautama Buddha, Atiśa was born into royalty. His father was a king known as Kalyanachandra and his mother was Shri Prabhavati. Raja Srichandra of Chandra Dynasty was his grandfather. One of three royal brothers, Atiśa went by the name of Candragarbha during the first part of his life. In fact, it was not until he traveled to Guge and encountered King Jangchup Ö (984–1078) that he was given the name Atiśa.

Studies
According to Tibetan sources, Atiśa was ordained into the Mahāsāṃghika lineage at the age of twenty-eight by the Abbot Śīlarakṣita and studied almost all Buddhist and non-Buddhist schools of his time, including teachings from Vaishnavism, Shaivism, Tantric Hinduism and other practices. He also studied the sixty-four kinds of art, the art of music and the art of logic and accomplished these studies until the age of twenty-two. Among the many Buddhist lineages he studied, practiced and transmitted the three main lineages were the Lineage of the Profound Action transmitted by Asaṅga and Vasubandhu, the Lineage of Profound View transmitted by Nagarjuna and Candrakīrti, and the Lineage of Profound Experience transmitted by Tilopa and Naropa. It is said that Atiśa had more than 150 teachers, but one key one was Dharmakīrtiśrī.
Another notable teacher of his during his time at Vikramashila was Ratnākaraśānti.

Teachings in Sumatra and Tibet

Tibetan sources assert that Atiśa spent 12 years in Sumatra of the Srivijaya empire and he returned to India in 1025 CE which was also the same year when Rajendra Chola I of the Chola dynasty invaded Sumatra.
Atiśa returned to India. Once back, the increasingly knowledgeable monk received much attention for his teachings and skills in debate and philosophy. On three separate occasions, the monk Atiśa was acclaimed for defeating non-Buddhist extremists in debate. When he came into contact with what he perceived to be a misled or deteriorating form of Buddhism he would quickly and effectively implement reforms. Soon enough he was appointed to the position of steward, or abbot, at Vikramashila which was established by Emperor Dharmapala. He is also said to have "nourished" Odantapuri.

Atiśa's return from Suvarnabhumi, where he had been studying with Dharmakīrtiśrī, and his rise to prominence in India coincided with a flourishing of Buddhist culture and the practice of Buddhism in the region, and in many ways Atiśa's influence contributed to these developments. According to traditional narratives, King Langdarma had suppressed Buddhism's teachings and persecuted its followers for over seventy years. According to the Blue Annals, a new king of Guge by the name of Yeshe-Ö sent his academic followers to learn and translate some of the Sanskrit Buddhist texts. Among these academics was Naktso, who was eventually sent to Vikramashila to study Sanskrit and plead with Atiśa to come teach the Dharma in his homeland.
Travelling with Naktso and Gya Lōtsawa, Atiśa journeyed through Nepal on his way to Tolung, the capital of the Purang Kingdom. (Gya Lōtsawa died before reaching Tolung.) On his way, he is said to have met Marpa Lōtsawa. He spent three years in Tolung and compiled his teachings into his most influential scholarly work, Bodhipathapradīpa, or Lamp for the Path to Enlightenment. The short text, in sixty-seven verses, lays out the entire Buddhist path in terms of the three vehicles: Hīnayāna, Mahāyāna, and Vajrayāna, and became the model for subsequent texts in the genre of Lamrim (lam rim), or the Stages of the Path, and was specifically the basis for Tsongkhapa's Lamrim writings. Here Atiśa met Dromtön, or Dromtonpa, who would become his primary disciple, regarded as both an enforcer of later propagation ethical standards and a holder of Atiśa's tantric lineage.

According to Jamgon Kongtrul, when Atiśa discovered the store of Sanskrit texts at Pekar Kordzoling, the library of Samye, "he said that the degree to which the Vajrayana had spread in Tibet was unparalleled, even in India. After saying this, he reverently folded his hands and praised the great dharma kings, translators, and panditas of the previous centuries."

Writings 

His books include:

Bodhipathapradīpa
Bodhipathapradipapanjikanama (his own commentary of )
Charyasamgrahapradipa contains some kirtan verses composed by Atiśa.
Satyadvayavatara
Bodhisattvamanyavali
Madhyamakaratnapradipa
Mahayanapathasadhanasangraha
Shiksasamuccaya Abhisamya
Prajnaparamitapindarthapradipa
Ekavirasadhana
Vimalaratnalekha, a Sanskrit letter to Nayapala, king of Magadha.

See also 
 Nyethang Drolma Temple
 Bikrampur Vihara

References

Bibliography
 
 Khenpo Konchog Gyaltsen, Great Kagyu Masters: The Golden Lineage Treasury, Snow Lion Publications
 Geshe Sonam Rinchen, Atiśa's Lamp for the Path to Enlightenment, Snow Lion Publications

External links

  
  
 Bibliography of Atisha's works, Item 596, Karl Potter, University of Washington
 Advice from Atiśa's Heart
 Atiśa Dipamkara on Banglapedia
 English Translation of Lamp to the Path of Enlightenment (by Dr. Alexander Berzin)

982 births
1054 deaths
Indian scholars of Buddhism
Monks of Vikramashila
Tibetan Buddhist spiritual teachers
Buddhism in Bangladesh
Madhyamaka scholars
Kadampa lamas
People from Bikrampur
Indian Buddhist monks
10th-century Bengalis
11th-century Bengalis
History of Tibetan Buddhism
Founders of Buddhist sects
History of Tibet